The 1980 Girabola was the second season of top-tier football competition in Angola. The season ran from 19 April 1980 to 28 February 1981. Primeiro de Agosto were the defending champions.

The league comprised 14 teams, the bottom three of which were relegated.

Primeiro de Agosto were crowned champions, winning their 2nd title, while Palancas do Huambo, Sagrada Esperança, Santa Rita and Sassamba da LS were relegated.

On the course of the championship, Santa Rita de Moçâmedes was renamed as Grupo Desportivo Welwitschia. Estrela Vermelha do Huambo, on its part, was renamed as Mambroa.

Francisco Carlos de Abreu aka Alves of Primeiro de Agosto finished as the top scorer with 29 goals.

Changes from the 1979 season
Relegated: 14 de Abril, Desp de Xangongo, Diabos Negros, FC de Cabinda, FC Mbanza Congo, Ginásio do KK, Juv do Kunge, Luta SC Cabinda, Makotas de Malange, Naval Porto Amboim, Sassamba da LS, Vitória AC do Bié
Promoted: Sagrada Esperança, Sassamba da LS

League table

Results

Round by round (home)

Source: Girabola

Season statistics

Top scorers

Most goals scored in a single match

Season statistics

Top scorer

Champions

References

External links
Federação Angolana de Futebol

Angola
Angola
Girabola seasons